Gibberula colombiana is a species of very small sea snail, a marine gastropod mollusk or micromollusk in the family Cystiscidae.

Description

Distribution
This marine species occurs in the Lesser Antilles off Martinique.

References

 Boyer F. 2003. A sibling species of Gibberula cordorae in the Leeward Antilles. Iberus 21(2): 29-36

External links
 MNHN, Paris: holotype at MNHN, Paris

colombiana
Gastropods described in 2003